Shafer is an unincorporated community in Tucker County, West Virginia. Its post office  has ceased to exist.

References 

Unincorporated communities in West Virginia
Unincorporated communities in Tucker County, West Virginia